Yurii Zakharieiev is a Ukrainian amateur boxer. In 2021, he became the first person to win both the Youth and Elite World Championships in the same year, and is the youngest Ukrainian to have won an amateur world championship.

Zakharieiev won a bronze medal at the 2022 European Amateur Boxing Championships in Yerevan though the result of his semifinal bout against Harris Akbar from England caused a controversy. Ukrainian training staff did not agree with the result by which Akbar was announced by 3-2 as the winner and they protested against that decision. As claimed by the vice-president of the Boxing Federation of Ukraine, the bout was reviewed by an independent board and Zakharieiev was admitted to be the actual winner and some judges were removed indefintively from the sport of boxing but this decision would have no effect on the tournament results.

References

External links 

Living people
Year of birth missing (living people)
Date of birth missing (living people)
Sportspeople from Odesa Oblast
Ukrainian male boxers
Light-middleweight boxers
AIBA World Boxing Championships medalists
21st-century Ukrainian people